The Pemberton House is an historic house in Columbus, Georgia.

Location
It is located at 11 7th Street in Columbus, Georgia.

Overview

It was the private residence of John Pemberton (1831–1888), the inventor of Coca-Cola. It is a Victorian cottage, and it has been moved to this new location and restored.

It is now a private residence and cannot be toured. 
The house has been listed on the National Register of Historic Places since September 28, 1971.

References

External links
 Historic Columbus Foundation - Pemberton’s Cottage

Houses on the National Register of Historic Places in Georgia (U.S. state)
Houses in Columbus, Georgia
Houses completed in 1855
Victorian architecture in Georgia (U.S. state)
Coca-Cola buildings and structures
Museums in Columbus, Georgia
Historic house museums in Georgia (U.S. state)
National Register of Historic Places in Muscogee County, Georgia